The Flaming Heart (Chinese:  你好，火焰蓝), is a 2021 Chinese rescue emotional drama streaming television series co-produced by Youku, and NICE.film, directed by Zhang Li Chuan, written by  Hou Shi Qi, Wu Wei, Ding Rui, and Chen Che. It starred Gong Jun (Chinese: 龚俊) and Zhang Huiwen (Chinese:  张慧雯) as the main leads. The series aired on Youku from July 8 to August 16 with 24 episodes.

Synopsis 
Huo Yan, (played by Gong Jun), is introverted and responsible firefighter; (Zhang Huiwen) played an emergency doctor, Yan Lan, who is warm, delicate and has excellent professional ability. Two special professional attributes also add different colors to the love between the two. They joined hands to rescue, and cooperated to save the injured. Huo Yan and Yan Lan's love model of mutual trust, mutual respect and common growth under the setting of special occupations.

Cast 
Gong Jun as Huo Yan
Zhang Huiwen as Yan Lan
Zhou Yan Chen as Wang Dayin
Wang Zi Wei as Jiang Tong
Pang Han Chen as Luo Jie
Zhou Lin Jia as Liu Xuan
Luo Yi as Bai Xiaolin
Lu Yu Peng as Ma Qianli
Wang Yi Zhou as Li Yanliang
Zhang Zhi Lu as Ji Yuan
Yao Qing Ren as Chen Pingeng
Zhao Hui Nan as Wu Zheng
Liu Chao as Han Pei

Soundtrack 
The Flaming Heart OST (你好，火焰蓝 音乐原声大碟) consisted of 10 songs, singing by various artists.

Production 

In November 2020, the main leads along with the production team were announced. The boosting ceremony was held on the same day. The series was filmed from November 8 to February 5, 2021 at Nanjing, Jiangsu Province.

Awards and nominations

International Broadcast

References

External links 
 

2020s Chinese television series
Chinese web series
Youku original programming